The 2017–18 season is FC Barcelona Femení's 17th season as FC Barcelona's official women's football section and its 10th consecutive season in Primera División.

Transfers

Results

Pre-season

Primera División

League table

Matches

UEFA Women's Champions League

Round of 32

Round of 16

Quarterfinals

Copa de la Reina

Quarterfinals

Semifinals

Final

Statistics

Squad appearances and goals
As of 24 May 2018

Disciplinary record
As of 24 May 2018

References

FC Barcelona Femení seasons
2017–18 in Spanish women's football
Barcelona Femenino